Pakistani folklore encompasses the mythology, poetry, songs, dances and puppetry from Pakistan's various ethnic groups.

Origins
Both Indo-Aryan mythology and Iranic mythology evolved from the earlier Indo-Iranic mythology, have played an instrumental role in the development of various Pakistani folklore. Despite linguistic and religious differences at one time, the folklore from across the country seem to revolve around the themes of love, war, historical events or the supernatural. Generally, folklore from the southern regions tend to be based upon historical events, such as a peasant uprising or a tragic love story. In contrast, folklore from the northern regions appear be based on the supernatural, such as on Deos (giants) and Pichal Peri (fairies).

Types

Sindhi folklore 

Sindhi folklore are folk traditions which have developed in Sindh over a number of centuries. Sindh abounds with folklore, in all forms, and colors from such obvious manifestations as the traditional Watayo Faqir tales, the legend of Moriro, epic tale of Dodo Chanesar, to the heroic character of Marui which distinguishes it among the contemporary folklores of the region. The love story of Sassui, who pines for her lover Punhu, is known and sung in every Sindhi settlement. examples of the folklore of Sindh include the stories of Umar Marui and Suhuni Mehar. Sindhi folk singers and women play a vital role to transmit the Sindhi folklore. They sang the folktales of Sindh in songs with passion in every village of Sindh. Sindhi folklore has been compiled in a series of forty volumes under Sindhi Adabi Board's project of folklore and literature. This valuable project was accomplished by noted Sindhi scholar Nabi Bux Khan Baloch. The material for the project has been collected both from the oral traditions village folks and the written record. This folklore series deals with diverse segments Sindhi folklore and literature, i.e. fables and fairy-tales, pseudo-historical romances, folk-poetry, folk songs, proverbs, riddles, etc.

Tales
The most famous Sindhi folk tales are known as the Seven Heroines of Shah Abdul Latif Bhittai.

Dance
 Ho Jamalo

Baloch folklore 

Baloch folklore are folk traditions which have developed in Balochistan over a number of centuries. Almost all folk traditions are in the Balochi language or Brahui language and deal with themes such as tragic love, resistance and war. The Baloch are known to respect bravery and courage, as is required under the Baloch code of Baloch Mayur. Many Baloch tribal leaders (Tamandar) are honoured through folk songs and ballads such as  who is remembered for defending the principle of ahot (protection).

Tales
 
 
 
 
 
 
  - A certain Bulethi dwelt in the land of Sangsila; he had much cattle but no son. And in that place he grew a crop of millet. One day he went to stroll round the field, and saw that a herd of cattle had been eating the millet. So he looked for their tracks all round the field to see which side they had come from. But he could find no track outside the banks, although the herd had grazed down the millet inside. The next day when he came he found the millet again grazed down, and again he searched for the tracks, but no track went outside the bank. Then he made a smoky fire, and left it burning at the millet-field that the cattle might come to it, for it is the custom of cattle to collect round a fire. When he came the third day he sees that the cattle, after grazing on the millet, had come and lain down by the fire. Then he knew in his heart that this herd had come from heaven. There were nineteen cows in the herd; he drove them off and brought them home. His wife's name was Sammi. He gave the herd to Sammi, saying: "This herd is yours; for when I die the heir will not give you the rest of my cattle." After this he moved away and went to live under the protection of Doda Gorgezh, and he said to Doda: "When I die, let my heirs carry off all the rest of my cattle, but this herd is Sammi's; do not then give them up to anyone, for they are under your guardianship." One day Sammi's husband died, and the heirs came and demanded his cattle. Doda gave them all the rest of the cattle, but did not give up Sammi's herd. One day soon after, the Bulethis came and carried off that herd. Doda went in pursuit, and came up with them at Garmaf, and there they fought. Doda was slain by the Bulethis, and his tomb is still there. After this the Bulethis came again, and drove off a herd of camels belonging to Rāis, Doda's cousin. Rāis, with his brethren Kāuri, Chandrām, Tota, Murid, and Summen, pursued them, overtook them, and gave them battle, but they were all slain there by the Bulethis, together with Rais. Only one brother was left, named Balach, who was a man of no spirit. Then Balach went to the shrine of Sakhi-Sarwar, and for three years he fetched water for the visitors at the shrine. After three years were passed, one night he saw a dream: Sakhi-Sarwar came to Balach, and roused him, saying, "Go and fight with the Bulethis." Getting up, he went and bought a bow, and at night he took it and unstrung it. When he arose next morning he finds the bow strung. Then Sakhi-Sarwar gave him his dismissal,—"Now thy bow is strung, go and fight thy enemies." So Balach went and waged war on the Bulethis; he had only one companion, Nakhifo by name (they were half-brothers, their father being Hassan, but Nakhifo's mother was a slave). No one else was with him. They fought in the Sham and Nesao plains, in Barkhan, and Syahaf, and Kahan, for in those days all that country belonged to the Bulethis. When men lay down to rest at night they would discharge their arrows at them; threescore-and-one men they slew. Then the Bulethis left the hill country, and marched down into the Indus plains. When Balach grew old he made his dwelling at Sangsila, and there a band of Bulethi horsemen fell upon him, and slew him, and lost one of their own men too. This was how it happened. The Bulethis, as they came up, called out to Balach: "Balach! give up that money you carried off!" Balach said: "Come nearer; I am deaf in my ears." So they came close up, and again demanded it. Then Balach said: "In byegone days, when I had the money by me, you never asked for it; but now, when it has all melted away from me, now you come asking for it." He had a razor in his hand, and he plunged it into the belly of the Bulethi, saying, "There's your money for you." The Bulethi fell dead, and then they fell upon Balach and slew him. 'Twas thus the Bulethis and the Gorgezhes fought.
 Shahdad Chota - tells the tale of a Baloch mercenary who battled the Portuguese in Makran.

Dance
Chaap - a Baloch style of dancing, has a curious rhythm distinguished by an inertial back sway with every forward step.

Chitrali folklore 

Chitrali folklore are folk traditions which have developed in the Chitral region of Khyber Pakhtunkhwa. Tales from this region are centered on the supernatural, within the realm of ghosts and spirits and are usually set in cold winter nights.

Tales
  - Chitrali dragons; are described as large, winged serpents with golden manes like a lion. Tales surrounding the azdhaar usually include protecting treasure and devouring warriors. Tales describe warriors would counter being consumed by the azhdaar by placing his sword above his head with the tip of the blade in one hand and the hilt in the other. This would tear the azhdaar's fish-like mouth.
  - folk tales describe the Halmasti is a wolf-like creature the size of a horse, which spits flames out of its mouth. According to local tradition, encountering the halmasti is bad omen and sightings of them are often only seen at night. To this day, many truck and jeep drivers from Chitral's remote valleys have claimed to have see the halmasti running alongside side their vehicles at night, just before experiencing harrowing accidents.
  - Chitrali bigfoot or yeti; are described as large bipedal apes, which often attack livestock or attempt to abduct women. Sightings though have been extremely rare in Chitral, which some claiming tales of barmanu come from Ghizer in Gilgit-Baltistan. 
  - described as a creature which howls out horrible cries during flash floods and avalanches in Chitral. 
  - described as an iron-legged creature, which roams about snowy winter nights in Chitral.
  - described as a female entity from Chitral's ancient folk religion, that would protects the home - the nangini was held in high reverence.

Dance
According to Anjuman Taraqqi Khowar Chitral, there are several main Chitrali dances:

Kashmiri folklore 

Kashmiri folklore are folk traditions which have developed in Azad Jammu and Kashmir and Jammu and Kashmir over a number of centuries. Kashmiri is rich in Persian words  and has a vast number of proverbs, riddles and idiomatic sayings that are frequently employed in everyday conversation. Folk heroes and folktales reflect the social and political history of the Kashmiri people and their quest for a society based on the principles of justice and equality.

Tales 
  - tells the tale of a young man who was known to steal from the rich and distribute it among the poor in the Kashmir Valley. He would cover himself in oil and enter the premises of wealthy individuals through their chimneys and then escape with all their gold. Layak Tchoor is among several venerated thieves in Kashmiri folklore including, Usman Cacha, Madav Lal and Layak Singh.

Dance 
Dances are done on all major functions and weddings in Kashmiri traditions such as birthdays, weddings, and crop harvesting. These include:

Pashtun folklore 

Pashtun folklore (Pashto: پښتون لوک) are folk traditions which have developed in Khyber Pakhtunkhwa and Afghanistan over a number of centuries.

Tales
 
 
 Khosrow and Shirin (translated from Persian)
 Momin khan and Sherino 
 Yusuf and Zulekha

Dance

Punjabi folklore 

Punjabi folklore is a tradition of Punjabi language oral story-telling that came to Punjab with the fusion of local people and migrants from the Arabian peninsula and contemporary Iran. Where Qisse reflect an Islamic and/or Persian heritage of transmitting popular tales of love, valour, honour and moral integrity amongst Muslims, they matured out of the bounds of religion into a more secular form when it reached Punjab and added the existing pre-Islamic Punjabi culture and folklore to its entity. The word qissa is an Arabic word meaning epic legend or a folk tale.

The Punjabi language is famous for its rich literature of qisse, most of the which are about love, passion, betrayal, sacrifice, social values and a common man's revolt against a larger system. In the Punjabi tradition, friendship, loyalty, love and qaul (verbal agreement or promise) are given utmost importance and most of the stories in the qisse hinge on these critical elements. Qisse are attributed to have inspired folk music in Punjabi and have added depth and richness to its delivery. These traditions were passed down generations in oral or written forms and were often recited, told as bedtime stories to children or performed musically as folk songs. Each qissa, if performed, has its unique requirements. A person able to sing or recite one may not necessarily transmit another.

The vocal ranges on the musical scale and accurate pauses, if not performed well leaves a performer breathless and unable to continue. Most of the beats used in modern Punjabi music (often misleadingly labelled Bhangra), originated from qissa tradition and recitations in old times. Qisse also boast to be among the best poetry every written in Punjabi. Waris Shah's (1722–1798) qissa of Heer Ranjha (formally known as Qissa Heer) is among the most famous Qisse of all times. The effect of Qisse on Punjabi culture is so strong that even religious leaders and revolutionaries like Guru Gobind Singh and Baba Farid, etc., quoted famous Qissas in their messages. It will not be wrong to say that popularity and nearly divine status of Qisse in Punjabi actually inspired many generations of spiritual leaders and social activists to combine the message of God with teenage love tales. This gave rise to what is known as the Sufi movement in Punjab region. The most popular writer/poet to have written Punjabi Sufi Qisse was Bulleh Shah (c.1680-1758).

Tales

Most of the Punjabi folktales (qisse) were written by Muslim poets who wandered the land.
 
 
 
 
 
 
 
  by Hafiz Barkhurdar

See also 
 Islamic mythology
 Iranic mythology
 Heer Ranjha
 Layla and Majnun
 LiLa Chanesar
 Mirza Sahiba
 Momal Rano
 Noori Jam Tamachi
 Prince Saiful Malook and Badri Jamala
 Punjabi Kisse
 Sassi Punnun
 Shah Jo Risalo
 Sohni Mahiwal
 Yusuf and Zulaikha

References

External links
 Baloch Folk Lore
 Folk Tales of Pakistan
 Pakistani Dragon Mythology

 
Folklore by country